MWS may refer to:

 Magic Workstation, a gameplay simulator for Magic: The Gathering
Marden–Walker syndrome, a rare autosomal recessive disorder
Member of the Wernerian Natural History Society, a former Scottish learned society
Modular weapon system, a rifle which has components that can be reconfigured to give the weapon different capabilities
 Muckle–Wells syndrome, a rare autosomal dominant disease
Murakami-Wolf-Swenson, a former name of Fred Wolf Films Dublin, an animation company